Transmedia storytelling (also known as transmedia narrative or multiplatform storytelling) is the technique of telling a single story or story experience across multiple platforms and formats using current digital technologies.

From a production standpoint, transmedia storytelling involves creating content that engages an audience using various techniques to permeate their daily lives. In order to achieve this engagement, a transmedia production will develop stories across multiple forms of media in order to deliver unique pieces of content in each channel. Importantly, these pieces of content are not only linked together (overtly or subtly), but are in narrative synchronization with each other.

History
Transmedia storytelling can be related to the concepts of semiotics and narratology. Semiotics is the "science of signs" and a discipline concerned with sense production and interpretation processes. Narratology looks at how structure and function factor into narrative with regards to its themes and symbols. Scolari goes on to show how semiotics and narratology are ways to analyze transmedia. Often the same text may create different kinds of implicit consumers. Transmedia storytelling is a narrative structure that breaks through both language (semiotics) and media (narratology). Some effective strategies in transmedia storytelling include producing a fresh perspective on the original material and its original context across a new form of media. Transmedia storytelling is how well a story is comprehended across media. An effective strategy of transmedia storytelling does not take a passive approach, instead engages with popular culture making a story its own and providing new context.

When it comes to strict adaptation in transmedia storytelling which is translating one medium to another: a book becomes a film, a comic becomes a video game. There is also a history describing pure transmedia: the book is an exact prequel to the film, ending at the exact moment prior to the films beginning. The earliest example of this would be the Bible. During early ages when many people were illiterate, narratives were passed on verbally, through "live theatre" where they were acted out, sermons, songs and/or illustrations.

The origins of the approach to disperse the content across various commodities and media is traced to the Japanese marketing strategy of media mix, originated in the early 1960s.  Some, however,  have traced the roots to Pamela: Or, Virtue Rewarded (1740) written by Samuel Richardson and even suggest that they go back further to the roots of earliest literature.

By the 1970s and 1980s, pioneering artists of telematic art made experiments of collective narrative, mixing the ancestors of today's networks, and produced both visions and critical theories of what became transmedia.
With the advent of mainstream Internet usage in the 1990s, numerous creators began to explore ways to tell stories and entertain audiences using new platforms. Many early examples took the form of what was to become known as alternate reality games (ARG), which took place in real-time with a mass audience. The term ARG was itself coined in 2001 to describe The Beast, a marketing campaign for the film A.I.: Artificial Intelligence.

Some early works include, but are not limited to:
 Ong's Hat was most likely started sometime around 1993, and also included most of the aforementioned design principles. Ong's Hat also incorporated elements of legend tripping into its design, as chronicled in a scholarly work titled Legend-Tripping Online: Supernatural Folklore and the Search for Ong's Hat.  
 Dreadnot, an early example of an ARG-style project, was published on sfgate.com in 1996.  This ARG included working voice mail phone numbers for characters, clues in the source code, character email addresses, off-site websites, and real locations in San Francisco.
 Harry Potter Franchise (1997–present) Best selling book series spawns films, officially developed immersive fan sites, social media, video games, off-Broadway stage plays and spin-off films (Fantastic Beasts and Where to Find Them and Fantastic Beasts: The Crimes of Grindlewald) 
Star Wars
Star Trek
The Matrix – feature film, 1999
 The Blair Witch Project – feature film, 1999
 On Line – feature film, 2001
 The Beast – game, 2001
 Majestic – video game, 2001
Avatar – feature film, 2009
Lost – TV series, 2004-2010
The Walking Dead
Disney
Marvel Comics
DC Comics
Scott Pilgrim
The Beatles

These examples were successful because of the impact their multi-platform storytelling became. Star Wars is one of the most extensive because its world is built across a multitude of platforms. The Blair Witch Project is impactful with their multi-platform storytelling because their online marketing campaign marks the first use of web storytelling. The Disney empire needs to be mentioned because much of the Disney "formula" for youth products: this tends to be straddle the nonexistent line between adaptation and TM storytelling but their franchise approach floods the market with multimedia examples. Many comics from the MCU or DC Universe that have been adapted to video games, feature films, animated shorts, comic book, etc.: Superman, Spiderman, Avengers (origin stories, sequels, spinoffs) have been successful.

Definition 
The study of transmedia storytelling—a concept introduced by Henry Jenkins, author of the seminal  book Convergence Culture—is an emerging subject. Because of the nature of new media and different platforms, varying authors have different understandings of it. Jenkins states the term "transmedia" means "across media" and may be applied to superficially similar, but different phenomena. In particular, the concept of "transmedia storytelling" should not to be confused with traditional cross-platform, "transmedia" media franchises, or "media mixes".

One example that Jenkins gives is of the media conglomerate DC Comics. This organization releases comic books before the release of its related films so the audience understands a character's backstory. Much of transmedia storytelling is not based on singular characters or plot lines, but rather focuses on larger complex worlds where multiple characters and plot lines can be sustained for a longer period of time. In addition, Jenkins focused on how transmedia extends to attract larger audiences. For example, DC Comics releases coloring books to attract younger audience members. Sometimes, audience members can feel as though some transmedia storylines have left gaps in the plot line or character development, so they begin another extension of transmedia storytelling, such as fan fiction. Transmedia storytelling exists in the form of transmedia narratives, which Kalinov and Markova define as: "a multimedia product which communicates its narrative through a multitude of integrated media channels".

In his book, You’re Gonna Need a Bigger Story, Houston Howard describes transmedia storytelling as “the art of extending a story across multiple mediums and multiple platforms in a way that creates a better business model for creators and a better experience for the audience.”

Current state

Both traditional and dedicated transmedia entertainment studios have fully integrated and embraced transmedia storytelling techniques into entertainment culture. It began as a search for a new storytelling form, native to digital content and communications channels. Developing technologies have enabled projects to include single-player experiences in addition to real-time multiplayer experiences such as alternate reality games such as Fortnite. While the list of current and recent projects is too extensive to list here, some notable examples of transmedia storytelling include:

 Slide, a native transmedia experience for Fox8 TV in Australia.
 Skins, a transmedia extension of the Channel 4/Company Pictures TV show by Somethin' Else in the UK.
 Halo, a video game series created by Bungie and currently developed by 343 Industries that has evolved to include novels, comic books, audio plays, live action web series and an upcoming live action television show from Paramount+.
 ReGenesis, a Canadian television series with a real-time transmedia (alternate reality game) extension that took place in sync with the episodes as they aired.
 The Lizzie Bennet Diaries, a web series adaptation of Pride and Prejudice with Twitter and Tumblr accounts.
 JFH: Justice For Hire from Creative Impulse Entertainment, a martial arts-themed transmedia comic book series created by Jan Lucanus that integrates live action films, a web series, animation, and music to tell stories across a universe timeline. 
 MyMusic, transmedia sitcom by Fine Brothers Productions as part of YouTube's original channels initiative, one of the more robust transmedia experiences. 
 Clockwork Watch, an independent project about a non-colonial steampunk world, told across graphic novels, live events, online and a feature film created by Yomi Ayeni.
 Defiance, a television show and video game paired to tell connective and separate stories.
 The HIVE Transmedia Project, by Daniel D.W. is a sci-fi novella series incorporating QR codes within the text to multimedia and a simulated reality story.
 Check, Please! by Ngozi Ukazu is an ongoing webcomic since 2013. The narrative is supplemented with a Twitter account of the main protagonist.
 Endgame: Proving Ground, a web, phone, book, movie and live paid actor campaign of transreality gaming by Niantic Labs beginning in 2014.
 The Man with the Jazz Guitar creates the portrait of jazz musician Ken Sykora, across music, film, radio, print and digital.
Pokémon, There are video games, television shows, and card games all that use Pokémon as a center and point of entry. There is no one text that is the origination of the Pokemon series, but the games Pokémon Red and Green were the starting point from which the franchise derived. 
24, American television series (2001-2010)
The Hunger Games, a young adult book series adapted to wildly popular movies and fan fiction based on the character plot lines
September Mourning, the project was created by Emily Lazar in 2009 and spans upon comic books, music, NFTs, and more

Scolari uses the example of 24 to show how transmedia storytelling occurs. 24 originated on Fox as a TV series but within a few years, it had generated a complex network of comics, video games, books, mobile episodes, etc. around the main character Jack Bauer and the Los Angeles Counter Terrorist Unit (CTU). Scolari writes that 24 creates a complex semiotic device for generating multiple implicit consumers who can be classified according to their relationship with the media. At the first level, there are single text consumers or those who just read the comic or play the video game. The consumer can understand the story without having to consume the rest of the texts. On a second level, 24 constructs different single media consumers. Here a viewer can enter the narrative world by watching the TV series every week. Finally, 24 created transmedia consumers because there are different media across different platforms that the consumer can enter into.

In "Digital State: How the internet is changing everything" (2013), author Simon Pont argues that transmedia storytelling is a theory that is at last starting to find its practical stride. Pont cites Ridley Scott's Alien prequel Prometheus (2012), and specifically the three viral films produced by 20th Century Fox as part of the advance global marketing campaign, as vivid executional examples of transmedia storytelling theory.

Where Robert McKee (Story, 1998) argues that back-story is a waste of time (because if the back-story is so good then this is surely the story worth telling), Pont proposes that storytellers like J. J. Abrams and Damon Lindelof have "pretty much lined McKee's argument up against a wall and shot it". Pont goes on to argue, "Parallel and non-linear timelines, 'multi-verses', grand narratives with crazy-rich character arcs, 'back-story' has become 'more story', the opportunity to add Byzantine layers of meaning and depth. You don't create a story world by stripping away, but by layering".

In "Ball & Flint: transmedia in 90 seconds" (2013), Pont likens transmedia story-telling to "throwing a piece of flint at an old stone wall" and "delighting in the ricochet", making story something you can now "be hit by and cut by".

Shannon Emerson writes in the blog post "Great Examples of Multiplatform Storytelling" that transmedia storytelling can also be called multiplatform storytelling, transmedia narrative, and even cross-media seriality. She also cites Henry Jenkins as a leading scholar in this realm.

Educational uses

Transmedia storytelling mimics daily life, making it a strong constructivist pedagogical tool for educational uses. The level of engagement offered by transmedia storytelling is essential to the Me or Millennial Generation as no single media satisfy curiosity. Schools have been slow to adopt the emergence of this new culture which shifts the spotlight of literacy from being one of individual expression to one of community. Whether we see it or not, Jenkins notes that we live in a globally connected world in which we use multiple platforms to connect and communicate. Using transmedia storytelling as a pedagogical tool, wherein students interact with platforms, such as Twitter, Facebook, Instagram, or Tumblr permits students' viewpoints, experiences, and resources to establish a shared collective intelligence that is enticing, engaging, and immersive, catching the millennial learners' attention, ensuring learners a stake in the experience.  Transmedia storytelling offers the educator the ability to lead students to think critically, identify with the material and gain knowledge, offering valuable framework for the constructivist educational pedagogy that supports student centered learning. Transmedia storytelling allows for the interpretation of the story from the individual perspective, making way for personalized meaning-making - and in the case of fully participatory projects - allows participants to become co-creators of the story.

In "The Better Mousetrap: Brand Invention in a Media Democracy" (2012), Pont explains, "Transmedia thinking anchors itself to the world of story, the ambition principally being one of how you can 'bring story to life' in different places, in a non-linear fashion. The marketing of movies is the most obvious applications of thie concept. Transmedia maintains that there's a 'bigger picture opportunity' to punting a big picture to additional platforms. Transmedia theory, applied to a movie launch, is all about promoting the story, not the 'premiere date of a movie starring...' In an industry built on the conventions of 'stars sell movies', where their name sits above the film's title, transmedia thinking is anti-conventional and boldly purist."

Transmedia storytelling is also used by companies like Microsoft and Kimberly-Clark to train employees and managers. 
Gronstedt and Ramos argues: "At the core of every training challenge is a good story waiting to be told. More and more, these stories are being told across a multitude of devices and screens, where they can reach learners more widely, and engage with them more deeply."

However, transmedia storytelling isn't used much at lower education levels. Children would thrive using transmedia storytelling worlds in their learning, but many of these worlds have copyrights linked to them. Transmedia storytelling has yet to tackle learning and educating children, but there have been a few transmedia worlds that have begun to show up with education, mostly by Disney.

Transmedia storytelling is apparent in comics, films, print media, radio, and now social media. The story is told different depending on the medium. With social media, the story is told differently depending on which social media platform someone uses (Twitter, Facebook, Instagram) The scale in which the impact each medium has differs from medium to medium. Before social media, radio and print media were the primary medium to connect with an audience. With the advancements in technology, social media has become the go-to medium to reach a large group of people in a fast amount of time. In the ideal form of TS, “each medium does what it does best — so that a story might be introduced in a film, expanded through television, novels, and comics, and its world might be explored and experienced through game play. Each franchise entry needs to be self-contained enough to enable autonomous consumption. That is, you don't need to have seen the film to enjoy the game and vice-versa.”

For the purpose of studying transmedia storytelling and how information becomes spreadable across multiple media platforms, we can look at four strategies for expanding the narrative world of media texts. First is the creation of interstitial microstories. Examples of these are video games, online clips, or comics. Next is the creation of parallel stories. Here, the idea is to create another story that unfolds at the same time as the macrostory. Scolari uses the example of the episode "24: Conspiracy". Third, the creation of peripheral stories is considered spin-offs from the original stories. The example of 24 novels is used to show how texts have a weak relationship to the macrostory, but still connected to it. The final strategy is user-generated content platforms like blogs or wikis. These environments are open source story-creation machines that allow users to add to the fictional world. This could also be called fan fiction.

Each medium reaches a different audience. Traditional mediums such as radio, print media, and film, garner older audiences because of the familiarity of that generation with those specific mediums. Scolari uses the example of Shrek. It is a film for kids, but some of the dialogue contains jokes that are meant for adults. Thus, the same text is creating at least two groups of consumers - children and adults or parents. The millennial generation uses a combination of mediums because there awareness of traditional media and the advancements of social media. The Gen Z audience is drawn to the social media medium similar to the reason to the Gen X audience is drawn to traditional mediums, because of the familiarity of the medium.

References

Further reading
 Azemard, Ghislaine (2013), 100 notions for crossmedia and transmedia, éditions de l'immatériel, p. 228
 Bernardo, Nuno (2014) Transmedia 2.0: How to Create an Entertainment Brand Using a Transmedial Approach to Storytelling
 Bernardo, Nuno (2011) The Producer's Guide to Transmedia: How to Develop, Fund, Produce and Distribute Compelling Stories Across Multiple Platforms 
 McAdams, Mindy (2016). Transmedia Storytelling. Conference paper: World Journalism Education Congress, Auckland, New Zealand.
 Phillips, Andrea. (2012) Transmedia Storytelling 
 Pont, Simon (2013) "Digital State: How the Internet is Changing Everything".  Kogan Page. 
 Pont, Simon (2012) "The Better Mousetrap: Brand Invention in a Media Democracy".  Kogan Page. 
 Pratten, Robert (2015) Getting Started in Transmedia Storytelling: A Practical Guide for Beginners 2nd Edition
Vernallis, Carol, Holly Rogers and Lisa Perrott (2020), Transmedia Directors: Artistry, Industry and New Audiovisual Aesthetics.
*Queiroz, Cecília; Cunha, Regina et al. (2014) "Interactive Narratives, New Media & Social Engagement" - Toronto, Canadá. 

 
Storytelling